The Oregon Jamboree is a three-day country music and camping festival held in Sweet Home, Oregon, United States. The event was founded in 1992 as an economic development project for the Sweet Home community. In addition to funding economic development activities, profits from the festival help support community humanitarian projects. The festival site is located on a large field south of Sweet Home High School. The venue extends across the Weddle Covered Bridge to Sankey Park. Recent attendance has exceeded 13,000 people per day.

Past performers include Kenny Chesney, Montgomery Gentry, Faith Hill, Toby Keith, Tim McGraw, Brad Paisley, Carrie Underwood, and Keith Urban.

No Jamboree was planned in 2020.

References

External links
Oregon Jamboree (official website)

Tourist attractions in Linn County, Oregon
Festivals in Oregon
Sweet Home, Oregon
1992 establishments in Oregon
Annual events in Oregon